Jose "J.P." Miranda (born October 30, 1985) is an American politician. He served as a Democratic party member of the Pennsylvania House of Representatives, from 2013 to 2014. Miranda previously worked on the staffs of Philadelphia City Council President Darrell Clarke and state Senator Shirley Kitchen.

He was elected to one term in 2012. In January 2014, Miranda and his sister were charged for maintaining a “ghost employee” on his payroll. He was subsequently defeated by Leslie Acosta in the primary election in 2014. In January 2015, Miranda pled guilty to false swearing and ethics violations.

References

External links
 
Legislative page

Hispanic and Latino American people in Pennsylvania politics
Hispanic and Latino American state legislators in Pennsylvania
Living people
Democratic Party members of the Pennsylvania House of Representatives
Pennsylvania politicians convicted of crimes
1985 births
21st-century American politicians
West Chester University alumni